(born February 20, 1976 in Kokonoe, Oita) is a field hockey player from Japan. She has represented her native country at the Summer Olympics three times (2004, 2008 and 2012 ). She was named Best Player at the 2006 Women's Hockey World Cup Qualifier in Rome, Italy.

References

External links
 
 
 

1976 births
Living people
Japanese female field hockey players
Field hockey players at the 2004 Summer Olympics
Field hockey players at the 2008 Summer Olympics
Olympic field hockey players of Japan
Sportspeople from Ōita Prefecture
Asian Games medalists in field hockey
Field hockey players at the 2012 Summer Olympics
Field hockey players at the 2002 Asian Games
Field hockey players at the 2006 Asian Games
Asian Games silver medalists for Japan
Asian Games bronze medalists for Japan
Medalists at the 2002 Asian Games
Medalists at the 2006 Asian Games